Kachalka is a rural locality (a village) in Borovetskoye Rural Settlement, Sokolsky District, Vologda Oblast, Russia. The population was 17 as of 2002.

Geography 
Kachalka is located 12 km northwest of Sokol (the district's administrative centre) by road. Shishkino is the nearest rural locality.

References 

Rural localities in Sokolsky District, Vologda Oblast